Hello, My Twenties! is a South Korean television series starring Han Ye-ri, Han Seung-yeon, Park Eun-bin, Ryu Hwa-young, Park Hye-su, Ji Woo and Choi Ara. It aired on JTBC from July 22, 2016 to October 7, 2017.

Synopsis
A slice-of-life story about five girls who live together in a sharehouse called "Belle Epoque" and how they connect over the growing pains in their youth. It is based on the issues that younger generations are likely to face in South Korea.

Cast

Overview

Main
 Park Hye-su (season 1) and Ji Woo (season 2) as Yoo Eun-jae
A 20-year-old Psychology major student who comes from the countryside.
 Han Seung-yeon as Jung Ye-eun
A 22-year-old Culinary Arts major with a religious background.
 Han Ye-ri as Yoon Jin-myung
A 28-year-old hardworking business major with a complicated family situation. 
 Park Eun-bin as Song Ji-won
A 22-year-old, majors in Journalism, a quirky adventurous roommate who claims she sees ghosts.
 Ryu Hwa-young as Kang Yi-na (season 1; guest season 2)
A 24-year-old sugar baby with expensive taste.She eventually works hard to be a career woman.
 Choi Ara as Jo Eun (season 2)

Recurring
 Yoon Park as Park Jae-wan (season 1; guest season 2)
Jin-myung's love interest, Italian restaurant chef.
 Choi Deok-moon as Oh Jong-gyu – Yi-na's mystery man
 Ji Il-joo as Go Doo-young – Ye-eun's abusive ex-boyfriend
 Shin Hyun-soo as Yoon Jong-yeol – Eun-jae's boyfriend
 Son Seung-won as Im Sung-min – Ji-won's male friend
 Yoon Jong-hoon as Seo Dong-joo – Yi-na's friend
 Kim Min-seok as Seo Jang-hoon (season 2)
Deputy of the share house, Belle Epoque's owner, Jo Eun's love interest.
 Lee You-jin as Kwon Ho-chang (season 2)
Ye-eun's love interest; an engineering student who knows nothing about dating.
 Ahn Woo-yeon as Heimdallr / Lee Jin-kwang (season 2)
A member of an idol group Asgard who is five years into his debut, but yet to reach stardom.
 Lee Ji-ha as Ho-chang's mother
 Kim Hyo-jin as Yoon Jin-myung's mother
  as Ahn Jung-hee – Yoo Eun-jae's mother
 Kim Yong-hee as dentist – Kang Yi-na's third lover
  as restaurant manager
  as Jo Hyun-hee – restaurant waitress
 Han Jeong-woo as Kang Yi-na's second lover
 Song Ji-ho as Kang Yi-na's stalker
  as Han Yoo-kyung – Jung Ye-eun's friend
 Choi Bae-young as Song Kyung-ah – Jung Ye-eun's friend
 Kim Si-eun as young Yoon Jin-myung 
 Yoon Yong-joon as Shin Yool-bin – Yoo Eun-jae's crush
 Kim Kyung-nam
 Jung Yi-seo as Ye-eun's classmate	
  as insurance employee
  as dancing student
  as Song Ji-won's father
 Kwon Eun-soo as Yoon Jong-yeol's junior
  as Yoo Eun-jae's aunt
 Shin Se-hwi as Ahn Ye-ji, Jo Eun's friend
 Jo Byeong-kyu as Jo Chung-han
 Yoon Sa-bong as Ho Chang's sister
 Seo Ye-hwa as Su & Su receptionist
 Go Min-si as Oh Ha-na

Special appearances
Season 1:
 Moon Sook as home owner grandmother
Season 2:
 Ji Il-joo as Go Doo-young
 PENTAGON as members of idol group Asgard 
 A.C.E as members of idol group The Fifth Column
 Ji Hye-ran
 Yoon Kyung-ho as Moon Hyo-jin's boyfriend
 Kim Jung-young as Song Ji-won' mother
 Kim Hak-sun as Jo-eun's father

Episodes

Series overview

Season 1 (2016)

Season 2 (2017)

Production
On February 16, 2017, the series was renewed for a second season. It was announced that Ryu Hwa-young would only make a cameo appearance, and that a new actress would be cast as the fifth girl of the Belle Epoque.

Originally, it was expected that all five main roles would be the same from the previous season. However, early on Ryu Hwa-young was removed from the main cast. Instead, a new character, Jo Eun, was created to fill the five-person dynamic of the show. Park Hye-soo was also supposed to be part of the main cast, but due to a scheduling conflict, she stepped down from the role. Unlike Ryu Hwa-young, this happened late into pre-production and it was decided that another actress would play her character Yoo Eun-jae; Ji Woo was cast.

Onew was originally cast in the role of Kwon Ho-chang, but he stepped down in light of controversy surrounding him ten days before the drama's premiere, and was replaced with Lee Yoo-jin.

Ratings

Original soundtrack

Awards and nominations

References

External links
  (season 1) 
  (season 2) 
 
  (season 1)
  (season 2)

2016 South Korean television series debuts
2017 South Korean television series endings
JTBC television dramas
Korean-language television shows
South Korean comedy-drama television series
South Korean mystery television series
South Korean romance television series
South Korean television series remade in other languages
2010s college television series
Television series by Drama House
Television series by Celltrion Entertainment